Praseodymium(III) bromide is a crystalline compound of one praseodymium atom and three bromine atoms.

Characteristics

Appearance
Praseodymium(III) bromide is a green solid at room temperature.
It is usually handled as a powder.

Physical
Praseodymium(III) bromide's molecular weight is 380.62 g. Praseodymium bromide has a density of  5.28 g/cm2.

 adopts the  crystal structure. The praseodymium ions are 9-coordinate and adopt a tricapped trigonal prismatic geometry. The praseodymium–bromine bond lengths are 3.05 Å and 3.13 Å.

Chemical
Praseodymium(III) bromide is hygroscopic. Praseodymium(III) bromide has an oxidation number of 3.

Hazard
Praseodymium(III) bromide can cause skin irritation (H315/R38), eye irritation (H319/R36), and that breathing dust/fume/gas/mist/vapours/spray of Praseodymium(III) bromide should be avoided (P261/S23), that one should wash hands thoroughly after handling (P264), one should wear protective gloves and clothes clothing, and wear eye protection and face protection (P280/S36/S37/S39), and that if one gets Praseodymium(III) bromide in their eyes, that they should wash their eyes cautiously for several minutes, removing contact lenses if possible (P305).

References

Bromides
Praseodymium compounds